is a railway station of in Tsuno, Miyazaki, Japan.

Lines

Layout 
The station consists of an island platform serving two tracks at grade with a siding. The station building is wooden structure built in traditional Japanese style and remodelled in 2017. It houses a staffed ticket window, a waiting area, the office of the local tourism association and a community space which features a diorama maintained by local railway enthusiasts. Access to the island platform is by means of a footbridge. A bike shed is provided at the station forecourt.

JR Kyushu had planned to cease staffing the station. To maintain service to residents, the Tsuno town authorities took over the management of the ticket window as a kan'i itaku agent on 1 April 2015.

Adjacent stations

History
In 1913, the  had opened a line from  northwards to Hirose (now closed). After the Miyazaki Prefectural Railway was nationalized on 21 September 1917, Japanese Government Railways (JGR) undertook the subsequent extension of the track as part of the then Miyazaki Main Line, reaching  by 11 September 1920. In the next phase of expansion, the track was extended to Mimitsu, which opened as the new northern terminus on 11 June 1921. Tsuno was opened on the same day as an intermediate station on the new track. Expanding north from Mimitsu in phases and joining up with other networks, the track eventually reached  and the entire stretch from Kokura through this station to Miyakonojō was redesignated as the Nippō Main Line on 15 December 1923. With the privatization of Japanese National Railways (JNR), the successor of JGR, on 1 April 1987, the station came under the control of JR Kyushu.

Passenger statistics
In fiscal 2016, the station was used by an average of 395 passengers daily (boarding passengers only), and it ranked 272nd among the busiest stations of JR Kyushu.

See also
List of railway stations in Japan

References

External links
Tsuno (JR Kyushu)

Railway stations in Miyazaki Prefecture
Railway stations in Japan opened in 1921